Trelawney was launched in 1819 at Greenock as a West Indiaman. She disappeared in August-September 1826 and was believed to have foundered.

Career
Trelawney first appeared in online issues of Lloyd's Register (LR) in 1820.

Stirling was the old Glasgow company of Stirling, Gordon & Co., which was active in the West India trade. They commissioned vessels from the preeminent shipbuilder in Greenock, John Scott & Sons. In February 1820 there appeared in the Advertiser a story that six of the finest vessels in the British mercantile marine had set sail. 

Trelawney appeared in 1823 in a list of ships registered in Scotland. It showed her as being registered at Greenock, and her owner as S.Gordon & Co. 

Trelawney and Crawford also appeared in a case brought before the Court of Exchequer in the year ending 5 July 1824. Crawford was charged with having a defective manifest and making a false report. He faced penalties of £101 4s 6¾d and £200. The court assessed him a fine of £20, plus £9 16s 7d in costs.

Loss
Lloyd's List reported in December 1826 that Trelawney, Crawford, master, had sailed from Jamaica for London on 10 August, and hadn't been heard from since. She was one of several vessels that it was feared may have foundered during heavy September winds.

Citations

References
 
  
 

1819 ships
Age of Sail merchant ships of England
Maritime incidents in 1826
Missing ships
Ships lost with all hands
Shipwrecks in the Atlantic Ocean